Tsaganomys altaicus is an extinct species of rodent from Asia, and the only species in the genus Tsaganomys.

Junior synonyms and likely junior synonyms: 
Cyclomylus lohensis
Cyclomylus minutus
Sepulkomys eboretus
Beatomus bisus
Pseudotsaganomys mongolicus
Pseudotsaganomys turgaicus

References

Oligocene rodents
Oligocene mammals of Asia
Prehistoric monotypic mammal genera
Prehistoric rodent genera